The Lake Arend is a natural lake in the Altmark region, northern Saxony-Anhalt, Germany. It is 23.3 m above sea level, and its area is 5.14 km², its depth nearly 50 m. It is the largest and deepest natural lake in Saxony-Anhalt.

The lake lies on top of a salt dome and developed by repeated caving-in events that continued into historical time; at the end of the 19th century it was believed to have been created by an earthquake in 815 AD. Hydrologically, the lake is more or less isolated with only a small artificial outflow connecting with the Elbe river via the river Jeetzel. The water body (0.147 bill. m³) only changes every 100 years. The town Arendsee and the municipality Schrampe are situated on its shores.

References

External links

Lakes of Saxony-Anhalt
LArend